Kemalist Turkey may refer to:
 Government of the Grand National Assembly, the government in Ankara during the Turkish War of Independence
 One-party period of the Republic of Turkey, the period when Turkey was governed by a one-party regime from 1923 to 1945

See also 
 Turkish National Movement
 Kemalism